Shoe-banging incident, Nikita Khrushchev at the UN General Assembly held in New York
Mike Milbury, a Boston Bruin, entered the MSG stands on 12/23/1979, disciplining an unruly fan with the fan's own shoe.
Muntadhar al-Zaidi, George W. Bush shoe throwing incident
Sheila Dixon, in 1991 Dixon waved her shoe at colleagues on the Baltimore City Council
Jarnail Singh (born 1973) threw shoe at P. Chidarbram